Augsburg is an unincorporated community in Wilberton Township, Fayette County, Illinois, United States.

References

Unincorporated communities in Fayette County, Illinois
Unincorporated communities in Illinois